Boris Nikolayevich Siskov (20 July 1920  25 February 1984) was a Soviet MiG-15 flying ace during the Korean War credited with 11 or 5 aerial victories. He was the final Soviet ace of the war, scoring his fifth (and possibly last) victory on 20 July 1953.

Awards
 Order of Lenin (4 June 1954)
 Medal "For Courage" (31 August 1945)
 Medal "For Battle Merit" (15 November 1950)

See also 
List of Korean War flying aces

References

Sources 

Russian aviators
Soviet Korean War flying aces
Soviet military personnel of the Korean War
1920 births
1984 deaths